Prince Erik, Duke of Västmanland (Erik Gustav Ludvig Albert; 20 April 1889 – 20 September 1918) was a Swedish and Norwegian prince. He was the third and youngest son of King Gustav V of Sweden and Victoria of Baden. In 1904, Prince Erik was appointed a Knight of the Norwegian Lion by his paternal grandfather, King Oscar II.

Life

Prince Erik had epilepsy and mild intellectual disability. His exact condition has not been published, but he may have had an injury at birth or been affected by his mother's strong pre-natal medication for pneumonia. He had pangs of severe anxiety, and Victoria called him "my much loved child of grief". He was described as handsome and physically healthy. His mental disability was not noticeable in brief conversation, but would become apparent if he was engaged at length.

Because of his condition, he was seldom seen in public and led a quiet life away from the public eye, similar to the life of Prince John of the United Kingdom. Because he was a member of the royal family, he was present in official royal photographs, but he had no official tasks. During 1907 to 1909, a residence was built for him away from the public eye in Djursholm, a relatively new garden community north of Stockholm.

Erik was cared for by many members of the same staff who were responsible for him and his brothers when they were children: the governess Louise Rinman, referred to by the siblings as Vass, was responsible for the upbringing of him and his siblings when they were little, and in the case of Erik, she continued to be so until his death. Every two weeks he was allowed a trip to the capital, during which he sometimes could be seen visiting the opera; these were the only times he was seen in public except for official photographs.

Death
In 1917, he complained about having to live in such isolation, and it was decided that he should have a new residence closer to Stockholm. However, he died the next year of the Spanish flu at Drottningholm Palace. His parents were not present when he died which, according to official memoirs, caused his father great sorrow in later years. His mother, who herself had poor health and spent parts of the year in Italy, was abroad at the time. Reportedly his brothers felt sorry for him.

His former residence on Germaniavägen in Djursholm has been in private ownership since the 1960s and today (2011) is the private residence of South Africa's ambassador to Sweden.

Honours and arms

Honours
   Sweden-Norway:
 Knight and Commander of the Seraphim, 20 April 1889
 Knight of the Order of Charles XIII, 20 April 1889
 Commander Grand Cross of the Sword, 20 April 1889
 Commander Grand Cross of the Polar Star, 20 April 1889
 Grand Cross of St. Olav, with Collar, 20 April 1889
 Knight of the Norwegian Lion, 21 January 1904
 : Knight of the Elephant, 20 November 1912
 : Grand Cross of the Legion of Honour
 :
 Knight of the Black Eagle
 Grand Cross of the Red Eagle
 : Knight of the House Order of Fidelity

Arms

Ancestors

References 

1889 births
1918 deaths
Royalty and nobility with disabilities
Eric 1889
Norwegian princes
House of Bernadotte
Dukes of provinces of Sweden
People with epilepsy
Deaths from Spanish flu
Infectious disease deaths in Sweden
Burials at Riddarholmen Church
Swedish people with disabilities
Swedish people of French descent
Swedish Lutherans
People from Stockholm
Knights of the Order of Charles XIII
Commanders Grand Cross of the Order of the Sword
Commanders Grand Cross of the Order of the Polar Star
Knights of the Order of the Norwegian Lion
Grand Croix of the Légion d'honneur
Sons of kings